Al Bataeh is a town located in outer skirts of the Emirate of Sharjah, the United Arab Emirates. The town only has a population of almost 4,000 as of 2015, and is one of the least populated municipalities of Sharjah. The town is home to Al Bataeh Club and Sharjah Desert Park.

References

Central Region, Sharjah
Populated places in the Emirate of Sharjah